IF Elfsborg had their best points average season, in spite of not repeating its 2006 title. Finishing just one point adrift of Kalmar FF, Elfsborg had cemented its place as one of the top Swedish sides, being further boosted by Anders Svensson turning down a lucrative offer from Shaktar Donetsk during the course of the season.

Squad

Goalkeepers
  Johan Wiland
  Abbas Hassan
  Jesper Hansen

Defenders
  Mathias Florén
  Johan Sjöberg
  Johan Karlsson
  Martin Andersson
  Teddy Lučić
  Andreas Augustsson
  Markus Falk Olander
  Marcus Översjö

Midfielders
  Anders Svensson
  Helgi Daníelsson
  Jari Ilola
  Daniel Mobaeck
  Stefan Ishizaki
  Jesper Florén
  Daniel Nordmark
  Emir Bajrami
  Elmin Kurbegović

Attackers
  Lasse Nilsson
  Denni Avdić
  Joakim Sjöhage
  James Keene
  Fredrik Berglund

Allsvenskan

Matches

 GAIS-Elfsborg 1-1
 0-1 Stefan Ishizaki 
 1-1 Fredrik Lundgren 
 Elfsborg-AIK 3-0
 1-0 Stefan Ishizaki 
 2-0 Joakim Sjöhage 
 3-0 Denni Avdić 
 Malmö FF-Elfsborg 1-1
 0-1 Emir Bajrami 
 1-1 Guillermo Molins 
 Elfsborg-Örebro 0-0
 Ljungskile-Elfsborg 1-0
 1-0 Martin Smedberg 
 Elfsborg-GIF Sundsvall 2-0
 1-0 Daniel Mobaeck 
 2-0 Fredrik Berglund 
 Hammarby-Elfsborg 0-0
 Elfsborg-Kalmar FF 1-0
 1-0 Fredrik Berglund 
 Elfsborg-Helsingborg 1-0
 1-0 Daniel Mobaeck 
 Trelleborg-Elfsborg 0-2
 0-1 Stefan Ishizaki 
 0-2 Youssef Fakhro 
 Elfsborg-IFK Göteborg 3-0
 1-0 Fredrik Berglund 
 2-0 Fredrik Berglund 
 3-0 Stefan Ishizaki 
 Djurgården-Elfsborg 0-2
 0-1 Anders Svensson 
 0-2 Stefan Ishizaki 
 Elfsborg-Gefle 0-1
 0-1 Hasse Berggren 
 Halmstad-Elfsborg 1-2
 0-1 Emir Bajrami 
 0-2 Fredrik Berglund 
 1-2 Sebastian Johansson 
 Elfsborg-IFK Norrköping 3-0
 1-0 Emir Bajrami 
 2-0 Lasse Nilsson 
 3-0 Stefan Ishizaki 
 IFK Norrköping-Elfsborg 0-1
 0-1 Denni Avdić 
 Elfsborg-GAIS 1-0
 1-0 Teddy Lučić 
 AIK-Elfsborg 0-2
 0-1 Stefan Ishizaki 
 0-2 Fredrik Berglund 
 Örebro-Elfsborg 2-0
 1-0 Robin Staaf 
 2-0 Eric Bassombeng 
 Elfsborg-Ljungskile 4-0
 1-0 Denni Avdić 
 2-0 Stefan Ishizaki 
 3-0 Denni Avdić 
 4-0 James Keene 
 GIF Sundsvall-Elfsborg 0-0
 Elfsborg-Malmö FF 4-0
 1-0 Stefan Ishizaki 
 2-0 Daniel Mobaeck 
 3-0 Emir Bajrami 
 4-0 James Keene 
 Elfsborg-Hammarby 1-0
 1-0 Christian Traoré 
 Kalmar FF-Elfsborg 2-1
 1-0 Viktor Elm 
 2-0 Viktor Elm 
 2-1 Joakim Sjöhage 
 Helsingborg-Elfsborg 2-2
 1-0 René Makondele 
 2-0 Henrik Larsson 
 2-1 Teddy Lučić 
 2-2 Fredrik Berglund 
 Elfsborg-Trelleborg 4-1
 1-0 Daniel Mobaeck 
 1-1 Fredrik Jensen 
 2-1 Johan Karlsson 
 3-1 Johan Karlsson 
 4-1 Lasse Nilsson 
 IFK Göteborg-Elfsborg 5-2
 0-1 Johan Karlsson 
 1-1 Gustaf Svensson 
 2-1 Pontus Wernbloom 
 3-1 Niclas Alexandersson 
 4-1 Jakob Johansson 
 5-1 Pontus Wernbloom 
 5-2 Daniel Nordmark 
 Elfsborg-Djurgården 1-0
 1-0 James Keene 
 Elfsborg-Halmstad 3-0
 1-0 Fredrik Berglund 
 2-0 Emir Bajrami 
 3-0 Lasse Nilsson 
 Gefle-Elfsborg 1-2
 0-1 Martin Andersson 
 0-2 Johan Karlsson 
 1-2 Hasse Berggren

Topscorers
  Stefan Ishizaki 8
  Fredrik Berglund 8
  Emir Bajrami 5
  Johan Karlsson 4
  Denni Avdić 4
  Daniel Mobaeck 3
  James Keene 3

Sources
  Soccerway - IF Elfsborg results

IF Elfsborg seasons
Elfsborg